Theoretical Chemistry Accounts: Theory, Computation, and Modeling is a peer-reviewed scientific journal publishing original (primary) research and review articles in theoretical chemistry, physical chemistry, quantum chemistry, and computational chemistry. It was founded in 1962 as Theoretica Chimica Acta and was given its present name in 1998. The publisher is Springer Berlin Heidelberg. The impact factor of this journal is 2.233 (2014). The editor-in-chief is the team of Carlo Adamo and Ilaria Ciofini, the associate editor is Weitao Yang, and the chief advisory editor is Donald G. Truhlar.

As Theoretica Chimica Acta the journal had the unusual policy of requiring that all articles had an abstract written in English, German, and French. Articles could be written in any of these languages or, very unusual for a modern science journal, in Latin. Only three articles were ever written in Latin. They were "Modus Computandi Eigenvectores et Eigenaestimationes e Matrice Densitatis" by T.K. Lim and M.A. Whitehead from McGill University in Canada; "Nova methodus adhibendi approximationem molecularium orbitalium ad plures iuxtapositas unitates" by M. Suard, G. Berthier (Paris, France) and G. Del Re (Rome, Italy); and "De structura electronica et stereochimica ionis Cu(NO2)64-" by Derek W. Smith from Department of Chemistry, The University, Sheffield, United Kingdom.

References

External links 

Chemistry journals
Publications established in 1962
Springer Science+Business Media academic journals